Tol-e Noqareh (also Romanized as Tol-e Noqāreh) is a village in Mishan Rural District, Mahvarmilani District, Mamasani County, Fars Province, Iran. At the 2006 census, its population was 71, in 15 families.

References 

Populated places in Mamasani County